The bell groove-toothed swamp rat (Pelomys campanae) is a species of rodent in the family Muridae found in Angola and the Democratic Republic of the Congo.
Its natural habitats are moist savanna, subtropical or tropical dry lowland grassland, arable land, and rural gardens.

References
 Dieterlen, F. 2004.  Pelomys campanae.   2006 IUCN Red List of Threatened Species.   Downloaded on 19 July 2007.

Pelomys
Mammals described in 1888
Taxonomy articles created by Polbot